Vuelvo (Spanish "I return") may refer to:

 "Vuelvo" (song), by Beto Cuevas
 Vuelvo, an unreleased Erreway album
 "Vuelvo", song by Yurena

See also 
 Vuelve (disambiguation)